Engagement between the United States and the Macedonian is 1813 oil painting by American painter Thomas Birch depicting the naval engagement fought near Madeira on October 25, 1812 between the US Navy heavy frigate  and the Royal Navy frigate .  The battle resulted in the capture of the Macedonian, which became the first British warship to be brought to an American harbour as a prize.

Birch painted the subject at least three times.  An original painting was displayed in the Oval Office at the White House from 1961 to 1963 during the presidency of John F. Kennedy.  Kennedy made plans to redecorate the Oval Office after his inauguration in 1961, and he wanted a painting of a naval battle to hang over the fireplace.  A report in The Philadelphia Inquirer led J. Welles Henderson (the lawyer, and son of Joseph Welles Henderson) to lend a painting of the engagement between the United States and the Macedonian and a second naval painting by Birch, which were part of his personal collection displayed at Philadelphia Maritime Museum.  The other painting depicted the earlier battle of USS Constitution against HMS Guerriere.   was captured in August 1812, but was too damaged and could not be brought back to port, so was set on fire and abandoned.

The work measures .  After being displayed at the White House, it was held at museums in Philadelphia.  It was sold by the estate of J. Welles Henderson at auction at Sotheby's in May 2008 for $481,000.

A slightly different and slightly larger version, which measures , also attributed to Birch 1813, has been held by the Museum of Fine Arts, Boston, since 1978.  A third version, which measures , also Birch 1813, is held by the Historical Society of Pennsylvania.

A version by or after Birch is at the Home of Franklin D. Roosevelt National Historic Site, in Hyde Park, New York; and a version  "After Thomas Birch" was sold at Christie's in 2017 for $11,250.

An engraving of the painting by Benjamin Tanner was published on 25 October 1813.  Another engraving was made by Samuel Seymour, 1815, and published by James Webster.

References
 USS United States vs. HMS Macedonian (1813), Sotheby's, 22 May 2008 (version displayed in the White House)
 Engagement Between the "United States" and the "Macedonian", Museum of Fine Arts, Boston
 An Action Between U.S.S. United States and Macedonian, Home of Franklin D. Roosevelt National Historic Site
 The H.M.S. Macedonian surrendering to the U.S.S. United States commanded by Captain Stephen Decatur, After Thomas Birch, Christie's, 20 January 2017
 19th-century America: Paintings and Sculpture: An Exhibition in Celebration of the Hundredth Anniversary of the Metropolitan Museum of Art, April 16 Through September 7, 1970, Issue 1, p. 18
 Preliminary ink drawing, Thomas Birch, 1813?, Library of Congress
Tanner print
 Capture of H.B.M. Frigate Macedonian, Capt. J.S. Carden by the U.S. frigate United States, Stephen Decatur, Esqr., Commander / painted by T. Birch, A.C.S.A. & P.A. ; engraved by B. Tanner, A.C.S.A., Library of Congress
 Tanner engraving, Library of Congress
 United States and Macedonian,  Benjamin Tanner after Thomas Birch, 1814, Pennsylvania Academy of Fine Arts 
Seymour print
 U.S. Frigate "United States" captures British Frigate "Macedonian", Samuel Seymour after Thomas Birch, Historical Society of Pennsylvania
 The U.S. Frigate United States Capturing His Britannic Majesty's Frigate Macedonian, 1815, Samuel Seymour after Thomas Birch,  National Gallery of Art 
 The United States and the Macedonian, 1815, Samuel Seymour after Thomas Birch, Detroit Institute of Arts

Maritime paintings
1813 paintings
American paintings